The Dream Team is an album by organist Jimmy McGriff recorded in 1996 and released on the Milestone label the following year.

Reception 

Allmusic's Richard S. Ginell said: "Everybody swings, everybody listens intuitively to each other and feels the down-home churchy grooves, and they recorded it all in one day at Rudy Van Gelder's studio. This has the ingredients for ranking as an instant classic in this idiom". On All About Jazz, Douglas Payne noted "It's nice to hear Jimmy McGriff like this, and I highly recommend The Dream Team to the McGriff mob and those folks into some good contemporary acid jazz". In JazzTimes, David Franklin wrote "For that good ol’ blues-drenched, Hammond B-3-style-jazz, you can't do much better than this. The recording boasts some of the masters of the genre and they live up to expectations. ... Infectious music you'll want to come back to".

Track listing
All compositions by Jimmy McGriff except where noted
 "McGriffin" (David "Fathead" Newman) – 7:12
 "Ain't It Funny How Time Slips Away" (Willie Nelson) – 6:19
 "Red Hot 'n' New" – 7:40
 "Fleetwood Stroll" – 9:49
 "Don't Blame Me" (Jimmy McHugh, Dorothy Fields) – 11:29	
 "'Tain't Nobody's Bizness If I Do" (Porter Grainger, Everett Robbins) – 8:14
 "Things Ain't What They Used to Be" (Mercer Ellington, Ted Persons) – 11:13

Personnel
Jimmy McGriff – Hammond X-B3 organ
David "Fathead" Newman – tenor saxophone
Red Holloway – tenor saxophone, alto saxophone
Mel Brown – guitar
Bernard Purdie − drums

References

Milestone Records albums
Jimmy McGriff albums
1997 albums
Albums produced by Bob Porter (record producer)
Albums recorded at Van Gelder Studio